Cuci is a commune in Mureș County, Transylvania, Romania. It is composed of five villages: Cuci, Dătășeni (Marosdátos), După Deal (Hegymegett), Orosia (Marosoroszi), and Petrilaca (Oláhpéterlaka).

The commune lies on the Transylvanian Plateau, on the banks of the Mureș River.

Demographics
According to the census from 2002 there were 2,200 people living in the commune. Of this population, 78.77% are ethnic Romanians, 14.22% are ethnic Hungarians, 6.90% ethnic Romani and 0.09% Germans.

See also
List of Hungarian exonyms (Mureș County)

References

Communes in Mureș County
Localities in Transylvania
Székely communities